General Barton may refer to:

Charles Barton (British Army officer) (1760–1819), British Army lieutenant general
Geoffrey Barton (1844–1922), British Army major general
Raymond O. Barton (1889–1963), U.S. Army major general
Robert Barton (British Army officer) (1768–1853), British Army general
Seth Barton (1829–1900), Confederate States Army brigadier general